Kronstad may refer to:

Places
 Kronstadt, a Russian town and seaport
 Kronstad, Bergen, a neighbourhood in Bergen, Norway
 Kronstad Hovedgård, a Norwegian manor house
 Kroonstad, a South African city

Other
 Kronstadt rebellion, anti-Bolshevik rebellion